The Global Warming Solutions Act of 2006, or Assembly Bill (AB) 32, is a California State Law that fights global warming by establishing a comprehensive program to reduce greenhouse gas emissions from all sources throughout the state. AB32 was co-authored by then-Assemblymember Fran Pavley (D-Agoura Hills) and then-Speaker of the California Assembly Fabian Nunez (D-Los Angeles) and signed into law by Governor Arnold Schwarzenegger on September 27, 2006.

On June 1, 2005, Governor Schwarzenegger signed an executive order known as Executive Order S-3-05 which established greenhouse gas emissions targets for the state. The executive order required the state to reduce its greenhouse gas emissions levels to 2000 levels by 2010, to 1990 levels by 2020, and to a level 80% below 1990 levels by 2050. However, to implement this measure, the California Air Resources Board (CARB) needed authority from the legislature. The California State Legislature passed the Global Warming Solutions Act to address this issue and gave the CARB authority to implement the program.

AB 32 requires the California Air Resources Board (CARB or ARB) to develop regulations and market mechanisms to reduce California's greenhouse gas emissions to 1990 levels by the year of 2020, representing approximately a 30% reduction statewide, with mandatory caps beginning in 2012 for significant emissions sources. The bill also allows the Governor to suspend the emissions caps for up to a year in case of emergency or significant economic harm.

The State of California leads the nation in energy efficiency standards and plays a lead role in environmental protection, but is also the 12th largest emitter of carbon worldwide. Greenhouse gas emissions are defined in the bill to include all of the following: carbon dioxide, methane, nitrous oxide, sulfur hexafluoride, hydrofluorocarbons and perfluorocarbons. These are the same greenhouse gases listed in Annex A of the Kyoto Protocol.

Requirements
AB 32 includes several specific requirements of the California Air Resources Board:
 Prepare and approve a scoping plan for achieving the maximum technologically feasible and cost-effective reductions in greenhouse gas sources or categories of sources of greenhouse gases by 2020. The scoping plan, approved by the ARB Board December 12, 2008, provides the outline for actions to reduce greenhouse gases in California. The approved scoping plan indicates how these emission reductions will be achieved from significant greenhouse gas sources via regulations, market mechanisms and other actions.
 Identify the statewide level of greenhouse gas emissions in 1990 to serve as the emissions limit to be achieved by 2020. In December 2007, the Board approved the 2020 emission limit of 427 million metric tons of carbon dioxide equivalent of greenhouse gases, however this limit was later revised to 431 million metric tons using updated methods that had been outlined in the IPCC Fourth Assessment Report.
 Adopt a regulation requiring the mandatory reporting of greenhouse gas emissions. In December 2007, the Board adopted a regulation requiring the largest industrial sources to report and verify their greenhouse gas emissions. The reporting regulation serves as a solid foundation to determine greenhouse gas emissions and track future changes in emission levels. In 2011, the Board adopted the cap-and-trade regulation. The cap-and-trade program covers major sources of GHG emissions in the State such as refineries, power plants, industrial facilities, and transportation fuels. The cap-and-trade program includes an enforceable emissions cap that will decline over time. The State will distribute allowances, which are trad-able permits, equal to the emissions allowed under the cap. Sources under the cap will need to surrender allowances and offsets equal to their emissions at the end of each compliance period.
 Identify and adopt regulations for discrete early actions that could be enforceable on or before January 1, 2010. The Board identified nine discrete early action measures including regulations affecting landfills, motor vehicle fuels, refrigerants in cars, tire pressure, port operations and other sources in 2007 that included ship electrification at ports and reduction of high GWP gases in consumer products.
 Ensure early voluntary reductions receive appropriate credit in the implementation of AB 32
 Convene an Environmental Justice Advisory Committee (EJAC) to advise the Board in developing the Scoping Plan and any other pertinent matter in implementing AB 32. The EJAC has met 12 times since early 2007, providing comments on the proposed early action measures and the development of the scoping plan, and submitted its comments and recommendations on the scoping plan in October 2008. ARB will continue to work with the EJAC as AB 32 is implemented.
 Appoint an Economic and Technology Advancement Advisory Committee (ETAAC) to provide recommendations for technologies, research and greenhouse gas emission reduction measures. After a year-long public process, the ETAAC submitted a report of their recommendations to the Board in February 2008. The ETAAC also reviewed and provided comments on the scoping plan.

Timeline
AB 32 stipulates the following timeline:

In late-January 2014, ARB plans to release the draft proposed Scoping Plan Update and Environmental Assessment. In February 2014, ARB will have a Board meeting discussion that will include additional opportunities for stakeholder feedback and public comment. In Spring 2014, ARB will hold a Board Hearing to consider the Final Scoping Plan Update and Environmental Assessment.
 

As of August 2016, AB 32 continues to be built upon. On September 9 Governor Jerry Brown strengthened the commitment to AB 32 by signing SB 32 by Sen. Fran Pavley (D-Agoura Hills) and AB 197 by Assembly member Eduardo Garcia (D-Coachella). This legally enshrined the goal outlined by Executive Order B-30-15, to reduce the state's greenhouse gas emissions 40% below 1990 levels by 2030. On July 17, 2017, both houses of the California State Legislature pass AB 398 with a two-thirds majority vote, which authorizes the California Air Resources Board to operate a cap-and-trade system to achieve these reductions.

Achievements

To date, ARB has identified nine discrete early action measures to reduce greenhouse gas emissions, including regulations affecting landfills, motor vehicle fuels, refrigerants in cars, tire pressure, port operations and other sources. Regulatory development for additional measures is ongoing.

The Environmental Justice Advisory Committee (EJAC) has met 12 times since early 2007 and submitted comments and recommendations on the scoping plan in October 2008. The Economic and Technology Advancement Advisory Committee (ETAAC) submitted a report of their recommendations to the Board in February 2008. The ETAAC also reviewed and provided comments on the scoping plan.

In June 2013, ARB held a kickoff public workshop in Sacramento to discuss the development of the Scoping Plan Update, public process, and overall schedule. 
In July 2013, subsequent regional workshops were held in Diamond Bar; Fresno; and the Bay Area, which provided forums to discuss region-specific issues, concerns, and priorities.

Strategies
 Cap-and-Trade Program: Firm limit on total greenhouse gas emissions. Covers 85% of all emissions statewide; includes participation in the Western Climate Initiative
 Electricity and Energy: Improved appliance efficiency standards and other energy efficiency measures; goal is for 33% of energy to come from renewable sources by 2020;
 High Global Warming Potential Gases: reduce emissions and use of refrigerants and certain other gases that have much higher impact, per molecule than carbon dioxide
 Agriculture: more efficient agricultural equipment, fuel use and water use
 Transportation: adherence to "Pavley Standards" to achieve reductions in greenhouse gas emissions from motor vehicles
 Industry: audit and regulate emissions from 800 largest industrial sources statewide, including the cement industry
 Forestry: preserve forest sequestration and other voluntary programs
 Waste and Recycling: reduce methane emissions from landfills; reduce waste and increase recycling/reuse

AB 32 Scoping Plan
Assembly Bill 32 (AB 32) required the California Air Resources Board (ARB or Board) to develop a Scoping Plan that describes the approach California will take to reduce greenhouse gases (GHG) to achieve the goal of reducing emissions to 1990 levels by 2020. The Scoping Plan was first considered by the Board in 2008 and must be updated every five years. ARB is currently in the process of updating the Scoping Plan. Details regarding this update are outlined below.

AB 32 Scoping Plan Update

The Scoping Plan Update (Update) builds upon the initial Scoping Plan with new strategies and recommendations. The Update identifies opportunities to leverage existing and new funds to further drive GHG emission reductions through strategic planning and targeted low carbon investments. The Update defines ARB's climate change priorities for the next five years and sets the groundwork to reach California's post-2020 climate goals set forth in Executive Orders S-3-05 and B-16-2012. The Update will highlight California's progress toward meeting the near-term 2020 GHG emission reduction goals defined in the initial Scoping Plan. It will also evaluate how to align the State's longer-term GHG reduction strategies with other State policy priorities for water, waste, natural resources, clean energy, transportation, and land use.

What are the key focus areas for the Update?

ARB plans to focus on six key topics areas for the post-2020 element. These include: (1) transportation, fuels, and infrastructure, (2) energy generation, transmission, and efficiency, (3) waste, (4) water, (5) agriculture, and (6) natural and working lands.

What recent activity has occurred in 2013?

In June 2013, ARB held a kickoff public workshop in Sacramento to discuss the development of the Scoping Plan Update, public process, and overall schedule. In July 2013, subsequent regional workshops were held in Diamond Bar; Fresno; and the Bay Area, which provided forums to discuss region-specific issues, concerns, and priorities. In addition, ARB accepted and considered informal stakeholder comments from June 13, 2013 through August 5, 2013. ARB also reconvened the Environmental Justice Advisory Committee to advise, and provide recommendations on the development of, this Update. On October 1, 2013, ARB released a discussion draft of the Update to the AB 32 Scoping Plan for public review and comment. On October 15, 2013, ARB held a public workshop and provided an update to the Board at the October 24, 2013 Board Hearing. Extensive public comment and input was received at the October Board Hearing. In addition, over 115 comment letters were submitted on the discussion draft.

What activities are planned for 2014?

In late-January 2014, ARB plans to release the draft proposed Scoping Plan Update and Environmental Assessment. In February 2014, ARB will have a Board meeting discussion that will include additional opportunities for stakeholder feedback and public comment. In Spring 2014, ARB will hold a Board Hearing to consider the Final Scoping Plan Update and Environmental Assessment.

What is the status of AB 32 implementation?

The California Global Warming Solutions Act of 2006 (AB 32) has been implemented effectively with a suite of complementary strategies that serve as a model going forward. California is on target for meeting the 2020 GHG emission reduction goal. Many of the GHG reduction measures (e.g., Low Carbon Fuel Standard, Advanced Clean Car standards, and Cap-and-Trade) have been adopted over the last five years and implementation activities are ongoing. California is getting real reductions to put us on track for reducing GHG emissions to achieve the AB 32 goal of getting back to 1990 levels by 2020.

Cap-and-Trade
On December 17, 2010 ARB adopted a cap-and-trade program to place an upper limit on state-wide greenhouse gas emissions. This is the first program of its kind on this scale in the United States, though in the north-eastern United States, the Regional Greenhouse Gas Initiative (RGGI) works on a similar principle. Through the Western Climate Initiative (WCI), California is working to link its cap and trade system to other states. In October 2013, California officially linked its cap-and-trade program with Quebec Ministry of Sustainable Development, Environment, Wildlife, and Parks. The program had a soft start in 2012, with the first required compliance period starting in 2013. Emissions are to be reduced by two percent each year through 2015 and three percent each year from 2015 to 2020. The rules apply first to utilities and large industrial plants, and in 2015 will begin to be applied to fuel distributors as well, eventually totaling 360 businesses at 600 locations throughout the State of California. Free credits will be distributed to businesses to account for about 90 percent of overall emissions in their sector, but they must buy allowances (credits) at auction, to account for additional emissions. The auction format used will be single round, sealed bid auction. A preliminary auction was held August 30, 2012 with the first actual quarterly auction to take place November 14, 2012.

CARB Quarterly Auction Results 
These auctions demonstrate the following trends: (1) after an initial spike in qualified bidder number, the number of qualified bidders began to decrease; (2) the percentage of 2015 and 2016 allowances sold increased continually to reach 100%; (3) the percentage of current year allowances sold remained constant at 100%; (4) although the settlement prices for current year allowances initially increased, they then began to decrease; (5) the settlement prices for the 2015 or 2016 allowances have increased.

Some of the most well-known bidders were California Department of Water Resources, Campbell Soup Supply Company, Chevron U.S.A. Inc., Citigroup Energy Inc., Exxon Mobil Corporation, J.P. Morgan Ventures Energy Corporation, Noble Americas Gas & Power Corp., Pacific Gas and Electric Company, Phillips 66 Company, Shell Energy North America, Silicon Valley Power, Southern California Edison Company, The Bank of Nova Scotia, Union Pacific Railroad Company, and Vista Metals Corp. A qualified bidder is an entity that registered for the auction, submitted an acceptable bid guarantee, and received acceptance from the ARB to participate in the auction.

Offsets
In addition to emission allowances, CCAs. Compliance entities may also use a certain percentage of offset credits in the system. Offsets credits are generated by projects that reduce emissions or act as sinks for green house gasses. Currently the Air Resources Board allows for different types of offset projects to generate offset credits: U.S. Forest and Urban Forest Project Resources, Livestock Projects (methane emission control), Ozone Depleting Substances Projects, and Urban Forest Projects.

Offset provisions in the cap and trade scheme are however controversial and have been challenged in court. In March 2012, Citizens Climate Lobby and Our Children's Earth Foundation, two California environmental groups, sued the California Air Resources Board for the inclusion of its offset provisions. Their request was denied and when the Our Children's Earth Foundation appealed the decision was affirmed.

Economic impacts

According to ARB, AB 32 is "generating jobs, promoting a growing, clean-energy economy and a healthy environment for California at the same time."
 AB 32 supports efficiency-driven job growth
 California gets more clean energy venture capital investment than all states combined
 Green technologies produce new jobs faster
 Venture capital investment produces thousands of new jobs
 Green jobs are growing faster than any other industry
 California leads the nation in clean technology
 California's economic powerhouses support AB 32
 AB 32 requires California to lower greenhouse gas emissions to 1990 levels by 2020.
 Climate change will have a significant impact on the sustainability of water supplies in the coming decades.

Political challenges
The bill was challenged by Proposition 23 on the November 2010 ballot, which aimed to suspend AB 32 until state unemployment stayed below 5.5% for four consecutive quarters. The proposition was defeated by a wide margin.

Legal challenges
Two lawsuits have been filed challenging the legality of ARB's auctions of GHG emission permits. The petitioners contend that the auctions are not authorized under AB 32, and that the revenues generated by the auctions violate California's Proposition 13 or Proposition 26. A hearing was conducted on both challenges on August 28, 2013, in Sacramento County Superior Court.

AB 26 was initiated by Assembly woman Susan Bonilla, District of Concord and it was heard in the Senate Environmental Quality Committee June 19, 2013. The bill is sponsored by the State Building and Construction trades Council, AFL-CIO, and supported by California Teamsters Public Affairs Council and the International Association of Heat and Frost Insulators Local 5. Briefly, the bill is about the labor unions who wants portion from cap and trade's revenue to increasing wages for their workers, getting more jobs and increasing the number of union members that work in the industry that actually produce greenhouse gas emission. In this case, union labor will be fighting environmental groups supportive of AB 32 goals. The bill passed, 7–0.

On Nov 12, 2013 The California Chamber of Commerce launched the first industry lawsuit against the auction portion of California's cap-and-trade program on the basis that auctioning off allowances constitutes an unauthorized, unconstitutional tax. The complaint was filed for Sacramento Superior Court and seeks to stop the auction and have the auction regulations declared invalid. However, California superior court has rejected the challenges to the state's cap-and-trade program, upholding a significant element of California's suite of programs to comply with AB 32 and to reduce the state's greenhouse gas emissions.
-

See also

Climate Change
Kyoto Protocol
Regulation of greenhouse gases under the Clean Air Act
Sustainable Communities and Climate Protection Act of 2008
Climate change in California

References

External links
Legal documentation

 

California statutes
Air pollution in California
Climate change policy in the United States
Energy policy of the United States
Environment of California
Politics of California
2006 in American law
2006 in California
2006 in the environment
¤